Bertrall L. Ross II (born 1976) is an American legal scholar.

Ross completed his bachelor's degree at the University of Colorado–Boulder, and earned a Master's in Public Affairs from the Woodrow Wilson School of Public and International Affairs in 2003, as well as a second master's degree from the London School of Economics. Ross obtained his degree in law from Yale Law School. He taught at the University of California, Berkeley as Chancellor's Professor of Law, until joining the University of Virginia School of Law in 2021 as Justice Thurgood Marshall Distinguished Professor of Law.

References

American expatriates in the United Kingdom
Alumni of the London School of Economics
Yale Law School alumni
Princeton School of Public and International Affairs alumni
1976 births
Living people
African-American legal scholars
University of Virginia School of Law faculty
University of Colorado Boulder alumni
UC Berkeley School of Law faculty